Adam Edouard Armour (born September 27, 2002) is an American professional soccer player who plays as a defender for MLS team Charlotte FC.

Career

Youth
Armour played for Capital Area Soccer League at the U-9 and U-13 levels. That club became North Carolina FC Youth, where he played at the U-14 level. He signed an academy contract with North Carolina FC of the USL Championship on April 4, 2019. He made his debut for North Carolina FC in a friendly against Club Necaxa on March 23, 2019. He signed a second academy contract with North Carolina FC on January 17, 2020.

Professional
On July 2, 2020, Armour signed with 1. FC Nürnberg in the German 2. Bundesliga. The following summer, on June 29, 2021, Armour signed with Charlotte FC of MLS.

On July 17, 2021, Armour moved on loan to USL Championship side Charlotte Independence for the remainder of their 2021 season.

On March 13, 2022, Armour scored the first goal in Charlotte FC's history in the 66th minute against Atlanta United.

International
Armour was called up to the United States men's national under-17 soccer team in April 2018 and made his international debut in a game against India. He played a total of 19 games with the team, including in the 2019 FIFA U-17 World Cup.

References

2002 births
Living people
1. FC Nürnberg players
American soccer players
Association football defenders
Charlotte FC players
Charlotte Independence players
North Carolina FC U23 players
North Carolina FC players
People from Burlington, North Carolina
Soccer players from North Carolina
United States men's youth international soccer players
USL League Two players
USL Championship players
American expatriate soccer players in Germany
American expatriate soccer players
Major League Soccer players